Indoor Sports is a video game developed by DesignStar's SportTime and first published in the U.S. by Mindscape in 1987 for the Commodore 64. It was converted to many other platforms, particularly in Europe where it was published by Databyte, Advance Software and Tynesoft (depending on platform).

Gameplay
Indoor Sports allows players to play simulations of bowling, darts, ping-pong and air hockey. The C16/Plus/4 version only has the first 3 events.

Reception
Info gave the Commodore 64 version of Indoor Sports four stars out of five, describing it as "an unusual and mixed bag". Approving of all four games' graphics and gameplay, the magazine concluded that "it's unusual titles like this that keep us fascinated with computer gaming year after year!" Computer Gaming World called the bowling game "quite difficult and badly executed" but said that the other games were much better, with darts being the best. The game was reviewed in 1988 in Dragon #133 by Hartley, Patricia, and Kirk Lesser in "The Role of Computers" column. The reviewers gave the game 2 out of 5 stars.

Reviews
Computer Gamer - Jun, 1987
Computer Gamer - Apr, 1987
Commodore User - Mar, 1987
ASM (Aktueller Software Markt) - Jan, 1988
Amstrad Action - Oct, 1987
ASM (Aktueller Software Markt) - Jan, 1987
ASM (Aktueller Software Markt) - Sep, 1987

References

External links
Superstar Indoor Sports at MobyGames
Indoor Sports at GameSpot

Review in Info

1987 video games
Amiga games
Amstrad CPC games
Apple II games
Atari ST games
Bowling video games
BBC Micro and Acorn Electron games
Commodore 16 and Plus/4 games
Commodore 64 games
Darts video games
DOS games
Mindscape games
Table tennis video games
Tynesoft games
Video games developed in the United States
ZX Spectrum games